Vijayaramaraju  is a 2000 Telugu action film directed by Veera Shankar. The film stars Srihari, Kota Srinivasa Rao and Urvasi in the lead roles. The film had musical score by Vandemataram Srinivas.The film won three Nandi Awards.

Cast
Srihari
Urvasi
Kota Srinivasa Rao
Ranganath
Jayaprakash Reddy

Awards
Nandi Awards
 Best Audiographer - Madhusudhan Reddy 
 Special Jury Award - Srihari
 Female Dubbing Artist - Silpa

References

External links
 

2000 films
2000s Telugu-language films
2000 action drama films
Indian action drama films